Murattu Kaalai is a 2012 Tamil-language action film written and directed by K. Selva Bharathy and produced by Amirtham Gunanidhi. A remake of the 1980 film of same name, it stars Sundar C., Sneha and Sindhu Tolani, while Suman and Vivek play supporting roles. The music was composed by Srikanth Deva. The film, which had been under production since 2008, released on 15 June 2012 to negative reviews and failed to repeat the success of original.

Plot
Kaalaiyan is a simple person and the best Jallikattu (bullfight) player in his village. His world revolves around his four younger brothers. Varadharajan, a Zamindar from the neighbouring village who lives an extravagant lifestyle. His close aide is the transgender Saroja. Varadharajan's sister Priya falls for Kaalaiyan when he wins a Jallikattu. In the meantime, Bhuvana is running from Varadharajan as he falls for her charm and tries to molest her. She takes refuge in Kaalaiyan's house. However, Varadharajan decides to marry Priya to Kaalaiyan, with an eye on his land. On the day of the marriage, when Kaalaiyan learns that the bride wants to split the bond between the brothers, he calls off the marriage. Kaalaiyan takes a liking for Bhuvana and the inevitable happens – romance blossoms. What follows is predictable, but there comes a surprise in the form of Saroja in the climax.

Cast

 Sundar C. as Kaalaiyan
 Sneha as Bhuvana
 Sindhu Tolani as Priya
 Suman as Varadharajan
 Vivek as Saroja / Saami
 Meenal as Saroja's maid
 Lollu Sabha Jeeva as Kaalaiyan's brother
 Periya Karuppu Thevar as Saroja's grandfather
 Stunt Silva as Suruli
 Cell Murugan as Veterinarian 
 Devan
 Thyagu
 Alex
 Vichu Vishwanath
 Chutti Arvind

Production
In September 2008, it was revealed that Tamil Nadu Chief Minister M. Karunanidhi's grandson Gunanidhi was set to produce a remake of AVM Productions's 1980 film, Murattu Kaalai. Sundar C was roped in to play the lead role, while Suman would play the villain role done by Jaishankar, and Suruli Rajan's comedy will be taken over by Vivek, in the venture to be directed by Selva Bharathy. The team initially hoped to begin production in December 2008 and released the film on 14 April 2009. Sneha was soon after assigned to play the lead female role, while Samiksha was also selected to play another leading role. However, during the first schedule in Pollachi, Samiksha was replaced by Sindhu Tolani for unknown reasons and the team subsequently completed two full schedules by January 2009. However Ayngaran International's financial crisis meant that Murattu Kaalai along with their other productions became stuck. The film re-emerged when Chief Minister of Tamil Nadu, M. Karunanidhi launched the audio of the film on 18 September 2010, which was received by actor Vikram and the film was expected to be released by 12 November 2010, but eventually did not.

The film subsequently remained completed by unreleased due to Ayngaran International's financial problems which had also stopped the release of other films such as Arjunan Kadhali and Kalavadiya Pozhudugal. The film finally was promoted and released by the production house on 15 June 2012.

Soundtrack

Music was scored by Srikanth Deva and released on Ayngaran. Podhuvaga En Manasu Thangam was reused and remixed from the 1980 film.

Critical reception
The film received mixed to negative reviews. Times of India rated the movie 3/5 stating that, "Still, the good news here is that, surprisingly, 'Murattu Kaalai' is not a disaster and works to an extent. But the bad news is that this is an entirely pointless remake with hardly anything new to offer". Anupama Subramanian of "Deccan Chronicle" rated the movie 2.5/5 praising Vivek's and Sundar.C's performances and stated that the movie is "Watchable Once".

Rohit Ramachandran of Nowrunning.com rated it 1/5 calling the film "sickening." Sify rated the movie as "Below Average" praising Santonio Terzio's work. Vivek Ramz of in.com rated Murattu Kaalai 2/5 calling it "a poor remake" and added that it's an example of how not to remake an old blockbuster. Camera work of Santonio Terzio was appreciated overall.

References

2012 masala films
Indian action films
Remakes of Indian films
2012 films
2010s Tamil-language films
Films scored by Srikanth Deva
Films directed by K. Selva Bharathy
2012 action films